Albanological Institute of Pristina,  or Instituti Albanologjik - Prishtinë, is the main Institute of Albanology in Kosovo. It is an independent public institution. Together with the Centre of Albanological Studies in Tirana, they represent the core scientific research centers on Albanology.

History
The institute was founded on 1 June 1953, in Pristina, in Autonomous Region of Kosovo and Metohija of Yugoslavia. Initially, the staff consisted of four researchers (Ilhami Nimani, Selman Riza, Mehdi Bardhi, and Ali Rexha) and several external collaborators. The Yugoslav authorities terminated the project on 25 December 1955, since they failed to put its activities under censure. The UDBA secret services sequestered all materials.

In the '60s, with the establishment of the University of Prishtina, the Albanological sciences in Kosovo restarted. The institute was reorganized on 28 February 1967, it had a staff of five people. During the first decade of its activities, the institute marked its results in all Albanological fields. A huge effort went into preparing new scientific researchers, and collecting materials on folklore, ethnology, linguistics, etc. A library was established and enriched with a vast number of published titles. With the increase in personnel number and research fields in 1977, the institute moved into its own newly constructed building.

After 1981, with the denigration of the political autonomy of Kosovo, the institute was placed under censure and political control. At the same time, all cooperation with institutions and researchers from Albania was prohibited. Some major projects as Atlasi dialektologjik i të folmeve shqipe (Dialectical Atlas of the Albanian Speakings) and Leksikoni i shkrimtarëve shqiptarë (The lexicon of Albanian writers) remained unfinished.

Its work continued even during the turmoils of the '90s. On 8 March 1994, the Serbian police enter the building and dragged the employees outside, beaten and covered in blood. Nevertheless, the work continued in private establishments, until 1 April 1998, when an Albanian-Serbian agreement was reached with some international intermediation, and the building was restored to the institute.

As of 2015, the institute had 34 researchers and 15 administrative employees.

Structure
The institute is structured in branches and sections:
Linguistics branch:
Dialectology section
Lexicography section
Language Culture section
Onomastics section
Literature branch:
General section
Folklore branch:
Folkloric literature section
Ethno-musicology section
History branch
History section
Archaeology section
Ethnology branch

Publishing
The periodicals consist of:
Gjurmime Albanologjike (Albanological Reconnaissance) bulletin with 3 series:
Philological Sciences, .
Folklore and Ethnology, .
History Sciences, .

There are 41 issues of each series published so far. For a period of time, selected articles are published also in French in a special edition named Recherche Albanologique. From 2008, all the three series can be read online at the Central and Eastern European Online Library.

Gjuha Shqipe (Albanian Language), practical-scientific magazine which focuses on applied linguistics and language culture. .

Both the periodicals above are published in cooperation with other Albanian and foreign researchers.

Special Editions comprise published projects, monographs, biographies, folkloric materials, etc. So far, there are over 500 titles published.

See also
University of Prishtina

References

Science and technology in Kosovo
1953 establishments in Kosovo
Scientific organizations established in 1953
Albanian studies